Marek Woźniak (born 5 March 1959) is a Polish politician who has served as Marshal of Greater Poland Voivodeship since October 2005.

He was born in Kalisz, Poland.

References

Civic Platform politicians
Living people
1960 births
Voivodeship marshals of Poland
Members of Greater Poland Regional Assembly